Helicina can refer to two taxa of gastropods:

 Helicina (suborder), a suborder of land snails and slugs also known as Sigmurethra
 Helicina (genus), a genus of land snails